This is a list of fictional characters from DC Comics who are or have been enemies of Hawkman and Hawkgirl/Hawkwoman. In chronological order (with issue and date of first appearance), with recurring villains noted in bold.

Golden Age enemies

Silver Age enemies

Modern Age enemies

References

External links
 The Silver Age Super-Villains Checklist
 Hawkman villains - DC Comics Database

Hawkman enemies
Hawkman enemies
Enemies